American Knees is a novel written by Shawn Wong, first published in 1995 by Simon & Schuster, and currently published by the University of Washington Press (2005). Conceived as a cultural response to Amy Tan's novel The Joy Luck Club, Wong's book depicts the love life of an Asian American man with three complex women.

The book chronicles with humor the romantic chapters in the life of Raymond Ding, a Chinese American university administrator who first marries and divorces the perfect Chinese American wife, dates and breaks up with a hapa (biracial) younger woman, and gets involved with a Vietnamese American co-worker haunted by memories of the war.

About the author 
Shawn Wong is the author of the award-winning novel Homebase and an editor of several anthologies of Asian American literature, including Aiiieeeee! An Anthology of Asian-American Writers and The Big Aiiieeeee!. He is an English Professor and the former director of the University Honors Program at the University of Washington.

Movie version 
A film adaptation, entitled Americanese (2006), was written and directed by Eric Byler, produced by Lisa Onodera, and stars Chris Tashima as Raymond Ding, Allison Sie as Aurora Crane and Joan Chen as Betty Nguyen. The film was acquired by IFC Films.

External links 
American Knees from University of Washington Press
review by Monica Chiu on MELUS
Shawn Wong on film adaptation on IMDiversity.com
Shawn Wong discusses American Knees becoming a movie, at Rainbow Bookfest (minority authors) in Northwest Asian Weekly

1995 American novels
American novels adapted into films
Chinese-American novels
Novels set in Los Angeles
Novels set in San Francisco